Oecomys cleberi, also known as Cleber's oecomys or Cleber's arboreal rice rat, is a species of rodent in the genus Oecomys of family Cricetidae. Known only from the Federal District in Brazil, its taxonomic status relative to O. concolor and O. paricola is unresolved.

References

Literature cited
Costa, L., Bonvicino, C., Weksler, M. and Paglia, A. 2008. . In IUCN. IUCN Red List of Threatened Species. Version 2009.2. <www.iucnredlist.org>. Downloaded on November 30, 2009.
Musser, G.G. and Carleton, M.D. 2005. Superfamily Muroidea. Pp. 894–1531 in Wilson, D.E. and Reeder, D.M. (eds.). Mammal Species of the World: a taxonomic and geographic reference. 3rd ed. Baltimore: The Johns Hopkins University Press, 2 vols., 2142 pp. 

Mammals of Brazil
Oecomys
Mammals described in 1981